Edward William Grinfield (1785–1864) was an English biblical scholar.

Life
He was the son of Thomas Grinfield and Anna Joanna, daughter of Joseph Foster Barham of Bedford, and brother of Thomas Grinfield. He was a schoolfellow of Thomas de Quincey at Wingfield, Wiltshire. He entered Lincoln College, Oxford, proceeded B.A. 1806, M.A. 1808, and was ordained in the same year by the Bishop of Lincoln.

After studying law at Lincoln's Inn and the Inner Temple, Grinfield became minister of Laura Chapel, Bath. It had been founded by Francis Randolph, its proprietor, in 1756. Later he moved to London, where he occasionally preached at Kensington.

In 1859 Grinfield founded and endowed a lectureship at Oxford on the Septuagint. He died at Brighton on 9 July 1864, and was buried in Hove churchyard.

Works
Grinfield wrote many pamphlets, articles, and reviews, as an advocate of Anglican orthodoxy. His works are:

 ‘Reflections on the Connection of the British Government with the Protestant Religion,’ 1807. 
 ‘The Crisis of Religion,’ 1811, and with ‘Strictures on Mr. Lancaster's System of Popular Education,’ 1812. 
 ‘Reflections upon the Influence of Infidelity and Profaneness on Public Liberty, with a Plan for National Circulating Libraries,’ 1817.
 ‘Connection of Natural and Revealed Theology,’ 1818. 
 ‘Cursory Observations upon the Lectures in Physiology, Zoology, and Natural History of Man, by Mr. Laurence,’ 2nd edition, 1819. 
 ‘Sermons on the Parables,’ 1819. 
 ‘The Researches of Physiology,’ 1820. 
 ‘Thoughts on Lord Brougham's Education Bill,’ 1821. 
 ‘Vindiciæ Anglicanæ, Letter to Dr. Copleston on his Inquiry into the Doctrine of Necessity and Predestination, with a second part,’ 1822.
 ‘Sermon on Paley's Exposition of the Law of Honour,’ 1824. 
 ‘The Doctrinal Harmony of the New Testament,’ 1824. 
 ‘A Reply to Mr. Brougham's Practical Observations upon the Education of the People,’ 1825. 
 ‘The Nature and Extent of the Christian Dispensation with reference to the Salvability of the Heathen,’ 1827. 
 ‘A Scriptural Inquiry into the Nature and Import of the Image and Likeness of God in Man,’ 1830. 
 ‘Sketches of the Danish Mission on the Coast of Coromandel,’ 1831. 
 ‘Christian Sentiments suggested by the Present Crisis; or, Civil Liberty founded upon Self-Restraint,’ 1831.
 ‘Reflections after a Visit to the University of Oxford,’ on the proceedings against Renn Dickson Hampden, 1836. 
 'The Chart and Scale of Truth,' 1840. 
 'Novum Testamentum Græcum. Editio Hellenistica,' 1843.
 'Scholia Hellenistica in Novum Testamentum,' &c., 1848. 
 'An Expostulatory Letter to the Right Rev. Bishop Wiseman on the Interpolated Curse in the Vatican Septuagint,' 1850. 
 'An Apology for the Septuagint,' 1850.
 'The Jesuits: an Historical Sketch,’ 1851, 1853. 
 ‘The Christian Cosmos: the Son of God the revealed Creator,’ 1856.

Grinfield Lecturers

1861–1862 Edward Halifax Hansell
1863–1865 John Day Collis
1865–1869 James Augustus Hessey
1869 William Kay
1871 Wharton Booth Marriott
1872–1874 Edward Hayes Plumptre
1876–1878 John Wordsworth
1882–1884 Edwin Hatch
1886–1890 Alfred Edersheim
1893, 1895–1897 Charles Henry Hamilton Wright
1901–1905 Henry Adeney Redpath
1905–1911 Robert Henry Charles
1920 Henry St. John Thackeray
1919–1921 George Buchanan Gray
1927–1931 Charles Harold Dodd
1935–1939 Godfrey Rolles Driver
1943–1945 Thomas Walter Manson
1945–1949 George Dunbar Kilpatrick
1961–1965 George Bradford Caird
1969–1973 Sidney Jellicoe
1996-1998 John Lowden
1998-2000 Eugene Ulrich
2005–2006 Tessa Rajak
2007–2008 Jennifer Dines
2009–2010 Anneli Aejmelaeus
2011–2012 John Lee
2013–2014 Nicholas De Lange
2020-2022 James K. Aitken

References

Sources

1785 births
1864 deaths
19th-century English Anglican priests
Alumni of Lincoln College, Oxford
Members of Lincoln's Inn
Members of the Inner Temple
British biblical scholars
Anglican biblical scholars